The NYS Armory is a historic former National Guard armory building located at Ticonderoga in Essex County, New York.  It was built in 1934–1935 and is a large, two story "T" shaped brick and case stone building with Tudor and Jacobean Revival style features.  The main seven bay block has a steeply pitched, slate-covered hipped roof and is flanked by two bay wings.

It was listed on the National Register of Historic Places in 1988.  The building now serves as a local community center.

References

Government buildings completed in 1934
Armories on the National Register of Historic Places in New York (state)
Buildings and structures in Essex County, New York
National Register of Historic Places in Essex County, New York
1934 establishments in New York (state)